Olyra latifolia, commonly known as carrycillo, is a species of bamboo in the grass family Poaceae. It occurs in Mexico, Central and South America, and in sub-Saharan Africa.

Description
The leaf base is constricted into a hairy "pseudo-petiole" and the apex is tipped by a long point. The tip of each branch is swollen and bears a single large, pistillate floret while further down the branch are several smaller, slender-stemmed, staminate florets, the inferior glumes being half the length of the superior glumes.

Distribution and habitat
This bamboo is found in both the New World and the Old World. In the Americas its range includes the West Indies, Mexico and Central and South America as far south as Paraguay, Bolivia and northern Argentina, while in Africa it occurs in sub-Saharan Africa southwards to Angola, Zambia, Zimbabwe and Mozambique, as well as in Madagascar and the Comoro Islands and has been naturalised in South Africa.

Cultivation
This bamboo can be propagated from culms (stems) growing up from the rhizome or from seed.

Uses
The stems of this bamboo have been used for drinking straws and to make bobbins for spinning.

References

Bambusoideae
Grasses of Africa
Plants described in 1759
Taxa named by Carl Linnaeus